Paul-Émilien Dalpé (1919 - April 16, 1994), C.M., also known as Paul-Émile Dalpé, was a Canadian labour unionist and nurse. He was born in Saint-Jérôme, Quebec and was the founding president of the Centrale des syndicats démocratiques (CSD), a Quebec labour central body.

In 1966 he was president of the National Federation of Services, part of the Confederation of National Trade Unions (CSN) which represented hospital workers.

In 1972, he was one of the dissident members of the CSN executive who led the split of the CSN that resulted in the creation of the more politically moderate CSD, and became the CSD's founding president    from 1972 until 1981. After he retired, he became a part-time member of the Economic Council of Canada.

Honours
On December 14, 1981, he was appointed as a  Member of the Order of Canada

References

1919 births
1994 deaths
Members of the Order of Canada
People from Saint-Jérôme
Trade unionists from Quebec